Daas is a 2011 Polish film written and directed by Adrian Panek and starring Andrzej Chyra, Danuta Stenka, Mariusz Bonaszewski and Olgierd Łukaszewicz. This is Panek's first feature work.

Film is a period drama that depicts timeless struggle between religion and secular authority, idealism and duplicity, eroticism and faith.
Daas explores the influence of 18th-century messiah claimant Jacob Frank (an authentic figure played by Olgierd Łukaszewicz). Claiming powers of mystical healing and prophecy, Frank promises immortality to his converts. Henryk Klein, a Viennese lawyer (Mariusz Bonaszewski) investigates Frank, and starts to believe that there has been a conspiracy formed that involves some of the most influential people in the Austrian Empire. Meanwhile, a minor nobleman Jakub Goliński (Andrzej Chyra), Frank’s long-time disciple who left his sect is seeking justice. Once a devoted believer, he now takes action against his former guru. The fates of these men inevitably interweave…

Daas was filmed in the Polish city of Wroclaw.

External links 
 

2011 films
Frankism